Peter Marius Andersen (25 April 1885 – 20 March 1972) was a Danish amateur football (soccer) player in the striker position, who won a silver medal with the Danish national team in the 1908 Summer Olympics football tournament. He played one game at the tournament, his only game for the national team. He played his club football with BK Frem.

References

External links
Danish national team profile
DatabaseOlympics profile

1885 births
1972 deaths
Danish men's footballers
Footballers at the 1908 Summer Olympics
Olympic footballers of Denmark
Olympic silver medalists for Denmark
Denmark international footballers
Boldklubben Frem players
Olympic medalists in football
Medalists at the 1908 Summer Olympics
Association football forwards